Ambattur, is located in north west part of Chennai City.

Ambattur may also refer to:
 Ambattur taluk, is a taluk.
 Ambattur Lake, is a lake.
 Ambattur Industrial Estate, is an specially designated industrial area in the Chennai neighbourhood of Ambattur.
 Ambattur division,  is a revenue division.
 Ambattur (state assembly constituency), is a state assembly constituency.
 Ambattur railway station, is a railway station.